Saphenous may refer to one of two saphenous veins or the saphenous nerve in the leg:
Great saphenous vein
Small saphenous vein
Saphenous nerve